Eleothinus abstrusus is a species of longhorn beetles of the subfamily Lamiinae. It was described by Henry Walter Bates in 1881, and is known from Honduras, Guatemala, and Nicaragua.

References

Beetles described in 1881
Acanthocinini